The goldenthroats are a small group of hummingbirds in the genus Polytmus.

The genus Polytmus was introduced by the French zoologist Mathurin Jacques Brisson in 1760 with the type species as Polytmus guainumbi thaumantias, a subspecies of the white-tailed goldenthroat. The name of the genus is from the Ancient Greek πολυτιμος polutimos "very costly", "valuable".

The genus contains three species:

References

 
Bird genera

Taxa named by Mathurin Jacques Brisson
Taxonomy articles created by Polbot